Vyšná Slaná is a village and municipality in the Rožňava District in the Košice Region of middle-eastern Slovakia.

History
In historical records the village was first mentioned in 1362.

Geography
The village lies at an altitude of 491 metres and covers an area of 15.357 km².
It has a population of about 525 people.

Culture
The village has a public library, a gymnasium and a football pitch.

External links
https://web.archive.org/web/20071217080336/http://www.statistics.sk/mosmis/eng/run.html 

Villages and municipalities in Rožňava District